Ashfield Giants were a motorcycle speedway team based at Saracen Park, Glasgow, Scotland between 1949 and 1953.  The track operated on an open licence in 1953 and were reformed for a one of season during the 2000 Speedway Conference League.

History
The original Giants team were the majority of the Newcastle Diamonds team of 1948. Tuesday nights 1949 to 1951 were "Giants Night" and arguably their most famous rider was Ken Le Breton, known as 'The White Ghost'. Ken (real name Francis) was the star man in his white painted leathers and led the Giants 1949 and 1950. Ken was the first of three Scottish-based riders to compete in a Final of the World Championship (1949). Sadly, he was killed in a track crash in his native Australia in early 1951; this prompted massive scenes of public grief at the stadium.

Co-promoters Johnnie Hoskins and Norrie Isbister presided over a colourful team with a rider in red leathers - Aussie Merv Harding, a rider in blue leathers - Aussie Keith Gurtner and a rider who rode in yellow and black - Scotsman Willie (the wasp) Wilson. Eric Liddell joined the fun with silver leathers. All this in a time when most riders wore the standard black leathers. The team finished 11th in their inaugural 1949 Speedway National League Division Two season and then finished 11th, 8th and 7th respectively during the next three seasons.

The Giants were never very successful and the change of race night to a Saturday in 1952 saw a significant decline. Norrie Isbister soldiered on in 1953 but could not prevent the demise of the Giants.

A greyhound racing track replaced the shale for many years before speedway returned in 1999, with Saracen Park now the home of both the Glasgow Tigers speedway team and Ashfield F. C.

Season summary

Notable riders
 Cyril Cooper
 Gruff Garland
 Jack Gates
 Alec (Farmer) Grant
 Merv Harding
 Ron Johnson
 Larry (John) Lazarus
 Ken Le Breton
 Ron Phillips
 Bruce Semmens
 Chum Taylor
 Willie Wilson

See also
 List of defunct motorcycle speedway teams in the United Kingdom

References

Defunct British speedway teams
Sports teams in Glasgow
History of Glasgow